Posten in the three main Nordic languages means 'The Post' and may refer to any of the Swedish, Norwegian, Danish or Finnish state postal companies:

 Posten AB, the Swedish postal service
 Posten Norge, the Norwegian postal service
 Post Danmark, the Danish postal service, commonly referred to as just 'Posten'
 Posten (Finland), the Swedish name of the Finnish postal service
 Posten på Åland, the postal service of the autonomous province Åland of Finland
 The Decorah Posten, a notable Norwegian international newspaper that was published in Iowa

Other uses
 Posten, Albania, a village in Berat County, Albania